Dolní Sokolovec is a municipality and village in Havlíčkův Brod District in the Vysočina Region of the Czech Republic. It has about 90 inhabitants.

Administrative parts
The village of Horní Sokolovec is an administrative part of Dolní Sokolovec.

References

Villages in Havlíčkův Brod District